Vlekkem is a sub-municipality of Erpe-Mere in Flanders. It is located on the Molenbeek in the Denderstreek, southeast of East Flanders and belongs to the Arrondissement of Aalst. The sub-municipality is bordered by the hamlet Egem of the sub-municipality Bambrugge, the sub-municipality Ottergem and the municipality Sint-Lievens-Houtem (sub-municipalities Vlierzele and Zonnegem). Vlekkem has 292 inhabitants as of 1 January 2003 and an area of 1.22 km. The population density is 240 inhabitants / km ².

Vlekkem 
Vlekkem was first mentioned in an official document in 1036. In this charter where the emperor Koenraad II recognized the Abbey Sint-Pietersabdij in Ghent and their possessions, they spoke of "et in Bursinghem et terram in Ottringhem et terram in Flachem". In the year 1209 they spoke of Vleckem. In the opinion of the historian Föstermann, the name of the village is derived from a personal name. At the end of the 18th Century Vlekkem had 55 houses and 275 inhabitants.

Landmarks 
In Vlekkem the Sint-Lambertus Church can be found. Vlekkem belongs to deanery of Lede.

Tourism 
Through Vlekkem runs the Molenbeekroute. The Molenbeekroute is a cycle track network, known primarily for the mills of the municipality Erpe-Mere and two brooks that can be found there, which both have the name Molenbeek (mill brook).

Sub-municipalities of Erpe-Mere
Populated places in East Flanders